The Liberty Crack is a technical rock climbing route on Liberty Bell Mountain near Washington Pass and is featured in Fifty Classic Climbs of North America.

References

External links 
rockclimbing.com
mountainproject.com

Climbing routes